House of Tales Entertainment GmbH, trading as House of Tales, was a German video game developer based in Bremen. The company was known for its point-and-click adventure games.

History 
House of Tales was founded in 1998 by Tobias Schachte and Martin Ganteföhr, who had previously developed children's video games for the ZDF. The company's first game, The Mystery of the Druids, was published by CDV Software in 2001. The company initially lacked a corporate office and organized in a decentralized fashion online, a rarity at the time. In 2008, House of Tales was bought by DTP Entertainment, but initially remained an independent development studio under the new parent company. At the end of 2009, tensions arose between the House of Tales management and that of DTP regarding the future direction of the studio and the poor sales of 15 Days. As a result, Schachte left the company in January 2010. Ganteföhr departed in March. Thereafter, House of Tales' company headquarters was moved by DTP from Bremen to Hannover, the location of Cranberry Production, another DTP-owned development house. House of Tales was subsequently integrated into the Cranberry team, marking the end of the company.

In December 2014, the Swedish publisher THQ Nordic acquired the rights to House of Tales' adventure games and made them available via digital distribution platforms.

Games 

For all of its games, House of Tales used a proprietary development environment called Inca ("Interactive Narrator's Companion for Authoring"), which includes a graphical user interface for building the infrastructure of a game and an adventure-specific scripting language.

Awards 
The Moment of Silence was voted Adventure of the Year in 2004 by PC Games and the website Adventure-Treff. Overclocked received the Innovation Award at the 2007 Deutscher Computerspielpreis.

See also 
Daedalic Entertainment – German adventure game developer
King Art Games – German adventure game developer
Frogwares – adventure game developer from the same period
Pendulo Studios – adventure game developer popular in Germany during the same time

References

External links 
Official site

Video game development companies
Video game companies established in 1998
Video game companies disestablished in 2010
Defunct video game companies of Germany
Companies based in Bremen
German companies established in 1998
German companies disestablished in 2010